This is a list of 12-metre yachts.

Gallery

References

Lists of individual sailing yachts